The Light Rail, also known as the Light Rail Transit (LRT), officially the North-West Railway, is a light rail system in Hong Kong, serving the northwestern New Territories, within Tuen Mun District and Yuen Long District. The system operates over  track, using  overhead power supply. It was once one of four systems comprising the KCR network in Hong Kong, before the MTR–KCR merger in 2007. It has a daily ridership of about 483,000 people.

History

Planning and commencement 
When Tuen Mun was developed in the 1970s, the Hong Kong government set aside space for the laying of rail tracks. There was uncertainty however as to which company would be chosen to build the railway. In 1982, Hong Kong Tramways showed interest in building the system and running double-decker trams on it, before abandoning the project after negotiations over land premiums for related property development failed. The government sought another builder. The Mass Transit Railway Corporation (MTRC) was "heavily indebted" at the time, and so Secretary for Transport Alan Scott invited the Kowloon-Canton Railway Corporation (KCRC) to consider the project instead. The KCRC announced they would build the system in 1984 to a budget of $1.5 billion, after investigating ways to improve commercial viability. After some research, construction commenced on 14 July 1985.

By that time, Kowloon Motor Bus (KMB) had developed its own network in Tuen Mun and Yuen Long, and there were about 10 routes serving within the districts internally, most of them profitable. However, the government introduced the concept of the "Light Rail Service Area" in both districts, within which the LRT would monopolise all public transport services, forcing the KMB to withdraw all internal bus services in favour of the Light Rail. It also forced the KMB to impose boarding and alighting restrictions for external routes. It was decided that services between town centres and settlements would be provided solely by the Light Rail, while feeder buses operated by the KCRC would connect remote sites to the network, replacing KMB's equivalent services where applicable.

The system was completed and fully operational in September 1988. The first section was opened to the public on 14 September 1988, with free rides between Tuen Mun and Yuen Long; normal, all-day service began four days later, on 18 September. The system consisted of two large and three small loops serving most of the public housing estates in northern Tuen Mun. Three branches: one to On Ting Estate in the southeast, one to the Tuen Mun Ferry Pier in the southwest and another northern branch all the way into the town of Yuen Long along Castle Peak Road. It was then known as Light Rail Transit or LRT and is also called as the North-west Railway according to the Kowloon–Canton Railway Corporation Ordinance and Mass Transit Railway (North-west Railway) Bylaw.

The transit system is the first and the only one in Hong Kong adopted zonal fare system. The feeder buses have fares independent of these zones, but provide discounts when passengers interchange between these buses and LRT. 70 single-deck LRVs were manufactured in Melbourne and Brisbane, Australia by Comeng, to be shipped to Hong Kong for the seven LRT routes in the system. Three of the routes were to Yuen Long and the others were confined to Tuen Mun.

Extensions
The system's first extension came for the southern and eastern parts of Tuen Mun. The eastern extension branches off the main line south of Siu Hong stop and crosses the river that runs through Tuen Mun immediately with a flyover. The line then runs along Castle Peak Road to a road north of the town centre, where it climbs to another flyover and rejoins the main route. The northern end of this extension is still the only non-triangular junction in the entire system.

The southern extension mainly consists of a route linking On Ting and Ferry Pier, on the newly reclaimed land near the river mouth of Tuen Mun River, known as "Mouse Island" by locals. A short spur was also built from the extension to another terminus at Sam Shing Estate, located near Castle Peak Bay. Three LRT routes were diverted (route 505 was extended to Sam Shing) and one feeder bus route (route 559) discontinued as a result of these changes.

Tin Shui Wai was originally an area with numerous fish ponds, but was developed as a residential new town in the early 1990s. With the increase of internal commuter traffic demand, an LRT spur was built north of Hung Shui Kiu stop that opened in 1993, with four stops serving the initial housing areas of the town. The area was further developed in the next few years and the line was extended by two stops: Chestwood and Tin Wing stop in 1995 (Tin Shui Wai Terminus was renamed Tin Wing after the opening of West Rail line). Two LRT routes were established, route 720 (now 751) to Yau Oi and route 721 Before Changed to (761) Then changed to (761P) to Yuen Long.

West Rail
The system remained essentially unchanged until the completion of the West Rail (now Tuen Ma line) in December 2003. Many changes were made, mainly around the new railway stations. The KCRC designed most railway stations in the LRT area to interchange with the new West Rail line. The idea was to encourage passengers to use the West Rail line instead of the Light Rail for longer journeys, thereby freeing up LRT vehicles for passengers making shorter journeys. For this purpose, an interchange discount system was launched with the introduction of the West Rail line system, meaning that passengers would pay no more (and in some cases less) to travel on West Rail line instead of the LRT for the main part of their journey. Although this most recent extension is the largest ever, no new vehicles were purchased. And although rearrangements were made, some infrequent and unreliable services resulted, causing passengers to blame the lack of vehicles and poor arrangement of new services. The KCRC has since modified the inside of some vehicles to allow more standing room for passengers during peak hours. They also made several route alterations to arrange them better.

In addition to the reconfiguration of light rail tracks around the new West Rail stations, the system was extended to reach northern Tin Shui Wai to serve ongoing development there.

Rolling stock

The system's vehicles consist of five different types of LRVs. All LRVs are uni-directional with driving cab on one side only, 20.2 metres long and have 3 sliding doors fitted on the left side (when facing the running direction from inside). This means that island platforms (except the triangular platform at Siu Hong stop) cannot be used at all in the LRT system and the termini have to feature loops for LRVs to reverse in direction.

Phase I LRVs were built by Comeng and put in service in 1988. They are numbered 1001–1070 and accommodate 43 seated passengers and 161 standees. The driver's cab interior and exterior design was conceived for KCRC by Design Triangle in 1986. Phase II LRVs were built by Kawasaki and entered service in 1992. They are numbered 1071-1090/1201-1210 and accommodate 26 seated and 185 standees. Cars 1071–1090 are cab cars while 1201–1210 are cabless trailers. Phase III LRVs were built by A Goninan and entered service in 1997. They are numbered 1091–1110 and accommodate 26 seated and 212 standees. Phase IV LRVs were manufactured by United Group and CSR and entered service in December 2009. They are numbered 1111–1132 accommodate 37 seated and 248 standees. Phase I LRVs have two wheelchair positions while Phase II, III, IV and V LRVs have three positions. The newest Phase V LRVs were manufactured by CRRC Nanjing Puzhen and entered service on 17 November 2020. They are numbered 1133-1162/1211-1220; 1133-1162 are cab cars while 1211-1220 are cabless trailer. 30 of these are set to replace existing Phase II LRVs, while the other 10 are for expansion.

Traction systems for Phase I and II LRVs consist of GTO thyristor choppers and DC traction motors provided by AEG, while those for the Phase III, IV and V LRVs consist of 2-level IGBT–VVVF inverters and asynchronous 3-phase AC traction motors provided by Mitsubishi Electric.

From the exterior it is difficult to differentiate between the first three types of LRVs. There are, however, distinct features that one can use to tell them apart; Phase III LRVs still retain their original green electronic displays while all other LRVs have new orange electronic displays. Phase I cars also have a wide window at the rear that can be opened in case of an emergency, while Phase II cars have a door at the back. The interior of the Phase III cars has a greenish look and the doors are also green. The Phase IV LRVs have a completely different appearance in contrast to the older phase. It has a white exterior livery with olive green and purple line on the side. The shape of the front of the LRV is more streamlined than the older phases. The door opening and closing mechanism was similar to the ones from the K-class cars used in the Tseung Kwan O line and Tung Chung line. The Phase IV has 3 surveillance cameras in each vehicle. Seat belts and wheelchair positions were also available in the Phase IV. On older-generation LRVs there is a perch seat but the Phase IVs do not maintain this feature. The refurbished Phase I LRVs have rounded rectangular windows while Phase IV LRVs have square ones.

The Phase II LRVs will not be refurbished; upon the commissioning of 30 Phase V LRVs, this will see the Phase II LRVs phased out. On August 28, 2022, the first two Phase II LRVs (1079 and 1204) were sent to the scrapyard. However, unlike the MLRs and M-Trains, they were not cut in half due to being short enough to support short trucks that were used. At 2 A.M. on August 29, the two vehicles left Tuen Mun Depot, for the last time. The Phase III LRVs are expected to be rebuilt and repainted with a scheme similar to the Phase IV LRVs.

Stops and routes

Stops

Notes

Routes
There are currently 12 routes in the Light Rail system.
 Route 505 runs between Siu Hong and Sam Shing via Kin On. The route was created in 1988 and extended from On Ting to Sam Shing in 1992. On 14 July 2002, due to the Light Rail grade separation works on Pui To Road being done as part of the Light Rail's integration with the then-under construction West Rail, route 505 was diverted to operate via Ngan Wai, and service to Shan King (North), Shan King (South) and Kin On was replaced by a temporary bus also numbered 505. The prior service was restored on 30 August 2003, following the completion of the grade separation works.
 Route 507 runs between Tuen Mun Ferry Pier and Tin King via Ngan Wai. It was created in 1989 and was extended from On Ting to Tuen Mun Ferry Pier in 1991.
 Route 610 runs between Tuen Mun Ferry Pier and Yuen Long via Ngan Wai and Ming Kum. It was created in 1988.
 Route 614 runs between Tuen Mun Ferry Pier and Yuen Long via San Hui. It was created in 1992 and replaced route 611, which ran between Tuen Mun Ferry Pier and Yuen Long via Ho Tin and Kin On from 1988 to 1992.
 Route 615 runs between Tuen Mun Ferry Pier and Yuen Long via Tin King. It was created in 1993.It was the longest route in MTR Light Rail.
 Routes 614P and 615P were created on 4 April 2004, and operate a circular service between Tuen Mun Ferry Pier and Siu Hong. The routes were created as a result of the Light Rail's transition into becoming a short-distance feeder service for West Rail, and upon their creation the service frequencies of routes 614 and 615 were accordingly halved, such that the overall service levels at stops between Siu Hong and Tuen Mun Ferry Pier remained the same.
 Route 705 runs an anticlockwise service around the Tin Shui Wai area via Tin Yat. The route was created on 22 August 2004 and replaced route 701, which ran a shorter anticlockwise service via Chestwood between 16 December 2003 and 21 August 2004.
 Route 706 runs a clockwise service around the Tin Shui Wai area and serves the same stops as route 705. The route was created on 9 April 2004 to enhance short-distance feeder service in Tin Shui Wai.
 Route 751 runs between Tin Yat and Yau Oi. It was created on 7 December 2003 and replaced route 720, which ran between Tin Wing and Yau Oi from 1994 to 2003. (Route 720 was created in 1994 and replaced route 722, which ran between Tin Wing and Siu Hong from 1993 to 1994, as well as route 612, which ran between Yuen Long and Yau Oi from 1988 to 1994.)
 Route 751P operates as a short-distance variant of route 751 between Tin Yat and Tin Shui Wai, and runs only during peak hours on school days. It was created in August 2004.
 Route 761P runs between Tin Yat and Yuen Long via Locwood. It was originally a short-distance variant of route 761, but then replaced route 761 when it was permanently discontinued on 8 October 2006. Route 761 ran between Tin Wing and Yuen Long via Wetland Park from 7 December 2003 to 7 October 2006, and was a replacement of route 721, which ran between Tin Wing and Yuen Long via Chestwood from 1993 to 2003. After the discontinuation of route 761, special services of route 761P to Tin Wing continued to operate at 30-minute intervals from 10:00 to 15:00 daily until 23 August 2010.

The present MTR Bus route 506 retains the number of the Light Rail route that it replaced. Light Rail route 506 ran between Tuen Mun Ferry Pier and Yau Oi via Kin On; it was created in 1988 and was extended from On Ting to Yau Oi in 1992. On 14 July 2002, due to the Light Rail grade separation works on Pui To Road, the route was suspended in its entirety and replaced by bus route 506. The suspension was originally intended to be temporary, but the Light Rail route was never resumed.

Fares 
The Light Rail is the only public transport system in Hong Kong to have fare zones and the only one with an honour system, in which there are no ticket gates. These fare zones apply only to passengers purchasing single-ride tickets from ticketing machines at LRT stops. Since the introduction of Octopus cards, however, passengers have a choice of ticketing options. All fares indicated below are for adults, while children and the elderly usually pay the concessionary fare, which is about half the adult fare.

Single-ride tickets 
There are six fare zones – 1, 2, 3, 4, 5 and 5A – for passengers purchasing single-ride tickets in Light Rail stops. Zone 5A was introduced solely for the latest extension in Tin Shui Wai, and both zones 5 and 5A are only connected to Zone 4. Therefore, travelling between zones 5 and 5A is considered as travelling through three zones.

Octopus cards 
Octopus card fares are calculated based on the minimum number of stops travelled (from origin to destination stops), rather than the number of fare zones travelled through. All stops have Octopus entry and exit processors at the entrances to and exits from platforms. Passengers may enter the system after scanning their Octopus card at an orange 'Entry Processor' reader. At this point, the maximum fare is deducted from the card. On completion of a journey, the card previously read by an 'Entry Processor' must be scanned at a dark-green 'Exit Processor', where the maximum fare less the fare incurred is refunded. Failure to do so within the time limit would cause the fare difference to be forfeited. If a person exits the same platform with the same card within 5 minutes, the fare deducted will be fully refunded.

Light-blue 'Enquiry Processors' can also be found on most platforms. Like enquiry processors found in other places, passengers can check the balance on their card, along with the 10 most recent Octopus transactions. If a Personalised Octopus card is used, the number of Light Rail credits accumulated is also shown.

Passengers using Personalised Octopus cards are able to participate in the Light Rail Bonus Scheme. A card on which fares totalling HK$30 (adults) or HK$15 (children/seniors) or more are paid over six consecutive days gets an automatic credit of HK$3 (adults) or HK$1.5 (children/seniors).

Passengers using Octopus cards that are registered with the MTR Club are automatically enrolled into the MTR Club Bonus Scheme. Members can earn Bonus Points by riding on the MTR, Airport Express, Light Rail and MTR Bus with their registered Octopus card during the promotion period. Members can then redeem these points for exclusive rewards. Passengers can visit the MTR website for the information of the gift during that particular promotion period.

Incidents
 In July 1994, a light rail vehicle and a lorry collided, killing the LRV captain.
 On 11 September 1994, a coach carrying factory workers ran a red light and was crushed between two light rail trains at a junction near Fu Tei. The coach driver and a coach passenger were killed. The two LRV captains were cleared of wrongdoing. The railway inspectorate also said the design of the junction was not to blame. The government said it would implement video recording at LRT junctions, improve road signage between Tuen Mun and Yuen Long, and better educate drivers.
 On 13 January 1995, a light rail train derailed as a result of intentional vandalism to the points at Tin King and Ming Kum roads. The KCRC had not received any threats or warning beforehand.
 On 9 February 2010, a construction crane fell on an LRT train as it approached Leung King stop. 18 were injured.
 On 17 May 2013, a CSR Phase IV light rail train, cars 1112 and 1117 on route 761P, derailed and crashed while navigating a tight curve at 40.9 km/h, in excess of the posted speed limit of 15 km/h. The train was turning from Kiu Hung Road to Castle Peak Road south of Tin Shui Wai. At least 77 people were injured in the crash. The LRV captain was convicted of negligence under the Mass Transit Railway Ordinance.
 On 19 August 2013, a 63-year-old man was killed at Locwood stop while crossing the tracks at a crossing point; the train did not stop in time.
 On 21 November 2014, LRV 1093 on route 507 collided with an MTR double decker bus near Tuen Mun Ferry Terminus. The bus crashed because it ran a red light. The train derailed and 20 were injured.

Gallery

References
Notes

Bibliography

External links

 

 
MTR
Former Kowloon–Canton Railway stations
750 V DC railway electrification

mt:Ferrovija Ħfief (MTR)